The following is a list of awards and nominations received by Seth MacFarlane. 

MacFarlane is an American actor, animator, writer, producer, director, comedian, and singer known for his work in film, and television. He's known for the television shows Family Guy (1999-present), American Dad (2005-present), The Cleveland Show (2009-2013) as well as Cosmos: A Spacetime Odyssey (2014) and The Orville (2017-present). His film projects include Ted (2012), A Million Ways to Die in the West (2014), and Ted 2 (2015). He has also released six studio albums Music Is Better Than Words (2011), Holiday for Swing (2014), No One Ever Tells You (2016), In Full Swing (2017), Once in a While (2019), and Great Songs from Stage & Screen (2020). His seventh album Blue Skies is set to release in 2022.

He has received an Academy Award, five Grammy Awards, and two BAFTA Award nominations. He has also received 24 Primetime Emmy Award nominations winning five awards for Family Guy. He has received an Academy Award nomination for Best Original Song for Everybody Needs a Best Friend from Ted (2012). He has also received a Writers Guild of America Award and a Producers Guild of America Award.

Major industry awards

Academy Awards
The Academy Awards are a set of awards given annually for excellence of cinematic achievements, and are organised by the Academy of Motion Picture Arts and Sciences (AMPAS). MacFarlane has received one nomination.

!
|-
!scope="row"| 2013
| Best Original Song
| "Everybody Needs a Best Friend" (from Ted)
| 
|  style="text-align:center;"|
|}

BAFTA Awards
The British Academy Television Awards is an annual award show presented by the British Academy of Film and Television Arts. The awards were founded in 1947 as The British Film Academy, by David Lean, Alexander Korda, Carol Reed, Charles Laughton, Roger Manvell and others. MacFarlane has been nominated twice.

!
|-
!scope="row"| 2008
| Best International Programme
| rowspan="2" | Family Guy
| 
| style="text-align:center;"|
|-
!scope="row"| 2010
| Best International Programme
| 
| style="text-align:center;"|
|}

Emmy Awards
The Primetime Emmy Award recognizes outstanding achievements in American prime time television programming. The accolade is annually bestowed by members of the Academy of Television Arts & Sciences. Awards presented for accomplishments in daytime television programming are designated "Daytime Emmy Awards." MacFarlane has won five awards out of twenty-four nominations. In 2020, he was inducted into the Television Hall of Fame.

!
|-
!scope="row" rowspan="2"|2000
| Outstanding Animated Program
| rowspan=2|Family Guy
| 
| rowspan="2" style="text-align:center;"|
|-
| Outstanding Voice-Over Performance
| 
|-
! scope="row" style="text-align:center;"| 2002
| Outstanding Music and Lyrics
| "You've Got a Lot to See", Family Guy
| 
| align=center|
|-
! scope="row" style="text-align:center;"| 2005
| Outstanding Animated Program
| rowspan=4|Family Guy
| 
| align=center|
|-
! scope="row" style="text-align:center;"| 2006
| Outstanding Animated Program
| 
| align=center|
|-
! scope="row" style="text-align:center;"| 2008
| Outstanding Animated Program
| 
| align=center|
|-
! scope="row" rowspan="3"  style="text-align:center;"| 2009
| Outstanding Comedy Series
| 
| rowspan="3" style="text-align:center;"|
|-
| Outstanding Animated Program
| American Dad!
| 
|-
| Outstanding Voice-Over Performance
| Family Guy
| 
|-
! scope="row"  style="text-align:center;"| 2010
| Outstanding Original Music and Lyrics
|"Down's Syndrome Girl", Family Guy
| 
| align=center|
|-
! scope="row" rowspan="2"  style="text-align:center;"| 2011
| Outstanding Animated Program
| The Cleveland Show
| 
| rowspan="2" style="text-align:center;"|
|-
| Outstanding Original Music and Lyrics
|"Christmastime Is Killing Us", Family Guy
| 
|-
! scope="row" style="text-align:center;"| 2012
| Outstanding Animated Program
| American Dad!
| 
| align=center|
|-
! scope="row" rowspan="2"  style="text-align:center;"| 2013
| Outstanding Special Class Program
| 85th Academy Awards
| 
| rowspan="2" style="text-align:center;"|
|-
| Outstanding Voice-Over Performance
| Family Guy
| 
|-
! scope="row" rowspan="2"  style="text-align:center;"| 2014
| Outstanding Documentary or Nonfiction Series
| Cosmos: A Spacetime Odyssey
| 
| rowspan="2" style="text-align:center;"|
|-
| Outstanding Character Voice-Over Performance
| rowspan=5|Family Guy 
| 
|-
! scope="row" style="text-align:center;"| 2015
| Outstanding Character Voice-Over Performance
| 
| align=center|
|-
! scope="row" style="text-align:center;"| 2016
| Outstanding Character Voice-Over Performance
| 
| align=center|
|-
! scope="row" style="text-align:center;"| 2017
| Outstanding Character Voice-Over Performance
| 
| align=center|
|-
! scope="row" rowspan="2"  style="text-align:center;"| 2018
| Outstanding Character Voice-Over Performance
| 
| rowspan="2" style="text-align:center;"|
|-
| Outstanding Character Voice-Over Performance
| American Dad! 
| 
|-
! scope="row" style="text-align:center;"| 2019
| Outstanding Character Voice-Over Performance
| Family Guy
| 
| align=center|
|-
! scope="row" style="text-align:center;"| 2020
| colspan=2|Television Hall of Fame
| 
| align=center|
|-
! scope="row" style="text-align:center;"| 2021
| Outstanding Character Voice-Over Performance
| Family Guy
| 
| align=center|
|}

Hollywood Walk of Fame
The Hollywood Walk of Fame comprises more than 2,600 five-pointed terrazzo and brass stars embedded in the sidewalks along 15 blocks of Hollywood Boulevard and three blocks of Vine Street in Hollywood, California. The stars are permanent public monuments to achievement in the entertainment industry, bearing the names of a mix of musicians, actors, directors, producers, musical and theatrical groups, fictional characters, and others. The Walk of Fame is administered by the Hollywood Chamber of Commerce and maintained by the self-financing Hollywood Historic Trust. MacFarlane received his star in 2019.

!
|-
!scope="row" |2019
| Seth MacFarlane
| Star on Hollywood Walk of Fame (Television Category)
| 
| style="text-align:center;" |
|}

Grammy Awards
The Grammy Awards are awarded annually by the National Academy of Recording Arts and Sciences of the United States for outstanding achievements in the music industry. Often considered the highest music honor, the awards were established in 1958. MacFarlane has been nominated five times.

!
|-
!scope="row"| 2006
| Best Comedy Album
| Family Guy: Live in Vegas
| 
|  style="text-align:center;"|
|-
!scope="row" rowspan="2"| 2012
| Best Song Written for Visual Media
| "Christmastime is Killing Us" (from Family Guy)
| 
| rowspan="2" style="text-align:center;"|
|-
| Best Traditional Pop Vocal Album
| Music Is Better Than Words
| 
|-
!scope="row"| 2016
| Best Traditional Pop Vocal Album
| No One Ever Tells You
| 
|  style="text-align:center;"|
|-
!scope="row"| 2018
| Best Traditional Pop Vocal Album
| In Full Swing
| 
|  style="text-align:center;"|
|}

Guild awards

Producers Guild of America Awards
The Producers Guild of America Awards (PGA) is a trade organization representing film, television, radio, and new media producers in the United States. MacFarlane has won one award.

!
|-
!scope="row" | 2015
| Cosmos: A Spacetime Odyssey
| Outstanding Producer of Non-Fiction Television
| 
| style="text-align:center;"|
|}

Writers Guild of America Awards
The Writers Guild of America Awards (WGA) is a trade organization representing film, television, radio, and new media writers in the United States. MacFarlane has won one award.

!
|-
!scope="row" | 2015
| Seth MacFarlane
| Animation Writers Caucus Animation Writing Award
| 
| style="text-align:center;"|
|}

Critic & Association awards

Critics' Choice Movie Awards
The Critics' Choice Movie Awards have been presented annually since 1995 by the Broadcast Film Critics Association for outstanding achievements in the film industry. MacFarlane has received one nomination.

!
|-
!scope="row"| 2013
| Ted
| Best Comedy
| 
|  style="text-align:center;"|
|}

Critics Choice Television Awards
The Critics' Choice Television Awards have been presented annually since 2011 by the Broadcast Television Journalists Association for outstanding achievements in the television industry. MacFarlane has received two awards from four nominations.

!
|-
!scope="row"| 2012
| rowspan="2" |Family Guy
| Best Animated Series
| 
|  style="text-align:center;"|
|-
!scope="row" rowspan="2"| 2014
| Best Animated Series
| 
| rowspan="2" style="text-align:center;"|
|-
| Cosmos: A Spacetime Odyssey
| Best Reality Series
| 
|-
!scope="row"| 2015
| Seth MacFarlane
| Louis XIII Genius Award
| 
|  style="text-align:center;"|
|}

Georgia Film Critics Association
The Georgia Film Critics Association (GAFCA) was created in 2011 with the intention to promote film criticism and the film industry within the state of Georgia. MacFarlane has been nominated once.

!
|-
!scope="row"|2013
|"Everybody Needs a Best Friend" (from Ted)
|Best Original Song
|
|style="text-align:center;"|
|}

Hollywood Critics Association Awards
The Hollywood Critics Association (HCA) (formerly the Los Angeles Online Film Critics Society) is a film and television critic organization founded in 2016 in Los Angeles, California. MacFarlane has been nominated once.

!
|-
!scope="row" |2022
| Family Guy
| Best Broadcast Network or Cable Animated Series or Television Movie
| 
| style="text-align:center;" |
|}

International Documentary Association Awards
The International Documentary Association Awards is awarded by the International Documentary Association since 1982 that promotes nonfiction filmmakers, and is dedicated to increasing public awareness for the documentary genre. MacFarlane has been nominated for one award.

!
|-
!scope="row" |2014
| Cosmos: A Spacetime Odyssey
| Best Limited Series
| 
| style="text-align:center;" |
|}

Phoenix Film Critics Society Awards 
The Phoenix Film Critics Society (PFCS) is an organization of film reviewers from Phoenix-based publications. MacFarlane has been nominated once.

!
|-
!scope="row" |2012
| Ted
| Breakthrough Performance Behind the Camera
| 
| style="text-align:center;" |
|}

St. Louis Gateway Film Critics Association 
The St. Louis Gateway Film Critics Association, founded in 2004, is an organization of film critics operating in Greater St. Louis. MacFarlane has won one award.

!
|-
!scope="row" |2012
| Ted
| Best Comedy
| 
| style="text-align:center;" |
|}

TCA Awards
The TCA Awards are awards presented by the Television Critics Association in recognition of excellence in television. MacFarlane has won one award.

!
|-
!scope="row" |2014
| Cosmos: A Spacetime Odyssey
| Outstanding Achievement in News and Information
| 
| style="text-align:center;" |
|}

Miscellaneous awards

Annie Awards
The Annie Awards are set of awards given annually for accomplishments in animation, and are organised by the ASIFA-Hollywood. MacFarlane has received one award out of three nominations.

!
|-
!scope="row"| 1999
| rowspan="3" |Family Guy
| Outstanding Individual Achievement for Music in an Animated Television Production
| 
|  style="text-align:center;"|
|-
!scope="row"| 2006
| Best Voice Acting in an Animated Television Production
| 
|  style="text-align:center;"|
|-
!scope="row"| 2009
| Best Voice Acting in an Animated Television Production or Short Form
| 
|  style="text-align:center;"|
|}

ASCAP Awards
The American Society of Composers, Authors and Publishers presents a series of annual awards shows in seven different music categories: pop, rhythm and soul, film and television, Latin, country, Christian, and concert music. MacFarlane has won four awards.

!
|-
!scope="row" rowspan="4" | 2013
| Family Guy
| Top Television Series
| 
| style="text-align:center;" rowspan="4"|
|-
| American Dad!
| Top Television Series
| 
|-
| The Cleveland Show
| Top Television Series
| 
|-
| Ted
| Top Box Office Films
| 
|}

The Comedy Awards 
The Comedy Awards, run by the American television network Comedy Central, honored the best of comedy. MacFarlane has received three nominations.

!
|-
!scope="row" rowspan="2"| 2011
| Family Guy
| Best Animated Comedy Series
| 
|  style="text-align:center;" rowspan="2"|
|-
| American Dad!
| Best Animated Comedy Series
| 
|-
!scope="row"| 2012
| Family Guy
| Best Animated Comedy Series
| 
|  style="text-align:center;"|
|}

DVD Exclusive Awards
The DVD Exclusive Awards was an awards program that honored direct to video productions released on DVD. MacFarlane has won two awards.

!
|-
!scope="row" rowspan="2"| 2006
| rowspan="2" | Stewie Griffin: The Untold Story
| Best Overall Movie, Animated DVD Premiere
| 
|  style="text-align:center;" rowspan="2"|
|-
| Best Animated Character Performance (Voice and Animation in a DVD Premiere Movie)
| 
|}

Empire Awards 
The Empire Awards is a British awards ceremony held annually to recognize cinematic achievements. MacFarlane has won one award.

!
|-
!scope="row"|2013
| Ted
| Best Comedy
| 
|style="text-align:center;"|
|}

Environmental Media Awards
The Environmental Media Awards is awarded by the Environmental Media Association since 1991 to the best television episode or film with an environmental message. MacFarlane has won one award.

!
|-
!scope="row" |2014
| Cosmos: A Spacetime Odyssey
| Best Reality Television 
| 
| style="text-align:center;" |
|}

Genesis Awards
The Genesis Awards are awarded annually by the Humane Society of the United States to individuals in the major news and entertainment media for producing outstanding works which raise public awareness of animal issues. MacFarlane has won one award.

!
|-
! scope="row" style="text-align:center;"| 2010
| Family Guy
| Sid Caesar Comedy Award
| 
| align=center|
|}

GLAAD Media Awards
The GLAAD Media Awards were created in 1990 by the Gay & Lesbian Alliance Against Defamation to "recognize and honor media for their fair, accurate and inclusive representations of the LGBT community and the issues that affect their lives." MacFarlane has been nominated once.

!
|-
!scope="row"|2007
|American Dad!
|Outstanding Individual TV Episode
|
|style="text-align:center;"|
|}

Golden Raspberry Awards
The Golden Raspberry Awards or the Razzies are awarded in recognition of the worst in film. MacFarlane has received three nominations.

!
|-
!scope="row" rowspan="3" | 2015
| rowspan="3"|A Million Ways to Die in the West
| Worst Actor
| 
| style="text-align:center;" rowspan="3"|
|-
| Worst Director
| 
|-
| Worst Screen Combo 
| 
|}

Jupiter Awards 
The Jupiter Awards is a German annual cinema award that recognizes talent and achievement. It's Germany's biggest audience award for cinema and TV - which is awarded annually by CINEMA and TV SPIELFILM. MacFarlane has won one award.

!
|-
!scope="row" |2012
| Ted
| Best International Film
| 
| style="text-align:center;" |
|}

MTV Movie & TV Awards
The MTV Movie & TV Awards is an annual award show presented by MTV to honor outstanding achievements in films. Founded in 1992, the winners of the awards are decided online by the audience. MacFarlane has received one award out of seven nominations.

!
|-
!scope="row" rowspan="5" | 2013
| rowspan="5" | Ted
| Movie of the Year
| 
| style="text-align:center;" rowspan="5"|
|-
| Best Shirtless Performance
| 
|-
| Best Fight 
| 
|-
| Best On-Screen Duo  
| 
|-
| Best WTF Moment
| 
|-
!scope="row" | 2016
| Ted 2
| Best Virtual Performance
|
| style="text-align:center;"|
|-
!scope="row" | 2017
| Family Guy
| Best Comedic Performance
|
| style="text-align:center;"|
|}

National Cartoonists Society Division Awards
The National Cartoonists Society Division Awards is an organization of professional cartoonists in the United States. The Society was born in 1946 when groups of cartoonists got together to entertain the troops. They enjoyed each other's company and decided to meet on a regular basis. MacFarlane has won one award.

!
|-
!scope="row"| 2009
| Family Guy
| Television Animation Award
| 
| style="text-align:center;"|
|}

Peabody Awards
The George Foster Peabody Awards or simply Peabody Awards is named after American businessman and philanthropist George Peabody, which recognizes distinguished and meritorious public service by American radio and television stations, networks, online media, producing organizations, and individuals. MacFarlane has won one award.

!
|-
!scope="row"| 2015
| Cosmos: A Spacetime Odyssey
| Peabody Award
| 
| style="text-align:center;"|
|}

People's Choice Awards
The People's Choice Awards is an American awards show recognizing the people and the work of popular culture. The show has been held annually since 1975 and is voted on by the general public. MacFarlane has won one award out of thirteen nominations.

!
|-
!scope="row"| 2007
| rowspan="4" |Family Guy
| Favorite Animated Comedy
| 
| style="text-align:center;"|
|-
!scope="row"| 2008
| Favorite Animated Comedy
| 
| style="text-align:center;"|
|-
!scope="row"| 2009
| Favorite Animated Comedy
| 
| style="text-align:center;"|
|-
!scope="row"| 2011
| Favorite TV Family 
| 
| style="text-align:center;"|
|-
!scope="row"| 2013
| Ted
| Favorite Comedy Movie
| 
| style="text-align:center;"|
|-
!scope="row"| 2014
| Dads
| Favorite New TV Comedy
| 
| style="text-align:center;"|
|-
!scope="row" rowspan="2"| 2015
| Family Guy
| Favorite Animated TV Show
| 
| rowspan="2" style="text-align:center;"|
|-
| American Dad!
| Favorite Animated TV Show
| 
|-
!scope="row" rowspan="3"| 2016
| Family Guy
| Favorite Animated TV Show
| 
| rowspan="3" style="text-align:center;"|
|-
| American Dad!
| Favorite Animated TV Show
| 
|-
| Ted 2
| Favorite Comedic Movie
| 
|-
!scope="row" rowspan="2"| 2017
| Family Guy
| Favorite Animated TV Show
| 
| rowspan="2" style="text-align:center;"|
|-
| American Dad!
| Favorite Animated TV Show
| 
|-
|}

PRISM Awards
The PRISM Awards are awarded annually by the Entertainment Industries Council to honor artists for accurate portrayal of substance abuse, addiction, and mental health in entertainment programming. MacFarlane has been nominated once.

!
|-
!scope="row" | 2009
| American Dad! 
| Best Comedy Episode
| 
| style="text-align:center;"|
|}

Satellite Awards 
The Satellite Awards are a set of annual awards given by the International Press Academy. MacFarlane has been nominated once.

!
|-
!scope="row" | 2004
| Family Guy 
| Best DVD Release of TV Shows
| 
| style="text-align:center;"|
|}

Saturn Awards
The Saturn Awards are presented annually by the Academy of Science Fiction, Fantasy and Horror Films to honor science fiction, fantasy, and horror films, television and home video. MacFarlane has won two awards out of twelve nominations.

!
|-
!scope="row" | 2008
| Family Guy
| Best Television Presentation
| 
| style="text-align:center;"|
|-
!scope="row" | 2013
| Ted
| Best Fantasy Film
| 
| style="text-align:center;"|
|-
!scope="row" | 2016
| Ted 2
| Best Fantasy Film
| 
| style="text-align:center;"|
|-
!scope="row" | 2017
| Family Guy
| Best Animated Series or Film on Television
| 
| style="text-align:center;"|
|-
!scope="row" rowspan="3"| 2018
| rowspan="2"|The Orville
| Best Science Fiction Television Series
| 
| style="text-align:center;" rowspan="3"|
|-
| Best Actor on Television
| 
|-
| Family Guy
| Best Animated Series or Film on Television
| 
|-
!scope="row" rowspan="3"| 2019
| rowspan="2"|The Orville
| Best Science Fiction Television Series
| 
| style="text-align:center;" rowspan="3"|
|-
| Best Actor on Television
| 
|-
| Family Guy
| Best Animated Series on Television
| 
|-
!scope="row" | 2021
| Family Guy
| Best Animated Series or Film on Television
| 
| style="text-align:center;"|
|-
!scope="row" | 2022
| The Orville
| Best Science Fiction Television Series
| 
| style="text-align:center;"|
|}

Spike Guys' Choice Awards 
The Spike Guys' Choice Awards (formerly Guy's Choice Awards) is an awards show produced by the Viacom cable channel Spike and held since 2007. MacFarlane has received two awards

!
|-
!scope="row" | 2012
| Seth MacFarlane
| Funniest M.F.
| 
| style="text-align:center;"|
|-
!scope="row" | 2013
| Ted
| Guy Movie of the Year
| 
| style="text-align:center;"|
|}

Spike Video Game Awards 
The Spike Video Game Awards (also known as the VGAs, and the VGX in its final year) were an annual award show hosted by Spike TV between 2003 and 2013 (a decade long run) that recognized the best computer and video games of the year. MacFarlane had received one award out of three nominations.

!
|-
!scope="row" rowspan="3" | 2006
| rowspan="3" | Family Guy Video Game!
| Best Game Based on a Movie or TV Show
| 
| style="text-align:center;" rowspan="3"|
|-
| Best Performance by a Male
| 
|-
| Best Cast
| 
|}

Teen Choice Awards
The Teen Choice Awards is an annual awards show that airs on the Fox Network. The awards honor the year's biggest achievements in music, movies, sports, television, fashion and other categories, voted by teen viewers aged 13 to 19. MacFarlane has received six awards out of thirty-one nominations.

!
|-
!scope="row" rowspan="6" | 2005
| rowspan="4" | Family Guy
| Choice TV Show: Comedy
| 
| style="text-align:center;" rowspan="6"|
|-
| Choice TV Actor: Comedy
| 
|-
| Choice TV Chemistry
| 
|-
| Choice TV Sidekick
| 
|-
| rowspan="3" | American Dad!
| Choice TV: Choice Summer Series
| 
|-
| Choice TV: Choice V-Cast
| 
|-
!scope="row" rowspan="2" | 2006
| Choice Animated Series
| 
| style="text-align:center;" rowspan="2"|
|-
| rowspan="3"|Family Guy
| Choice Animated Series
| 
|-
!scope="row" | 2007
| Choice Animated Series
| 
| style="text-align:center;"|
|-
!scope="row" rowspan="2" | 2008
| Choice Animated Series
| 
| style="text-align:center;" rowspan="2"|
|-
| American Dad!
| Choice Animated Series
| 
|-
!scope="row" rowspan="2" | 2009
| Family Guy
| Choice Animated Series
| 
| style="text-align:center;" rowspan="2"|
|-
| American Dad!
| Choice Animated Series
| 
|-
!scope="row" rowspan="3" | 2010
| Family Guy
| Choice Animated Series
| 
| style="text-align:center;" rowspan="3"|
|-
| American Dad!
| Choice Animated Series
| 
|-
| The Cleveland Show
| Choice Animated Series
|  
|-
!scope="row" rowspan="4" | 2011
| rowspan="2" | Family Guy
| Choice Animated Series
| 
| style="text-align:center;" rowspan="4"|
|-
| Choice TV Villain
| 
|-
| American Dad!
| Choice Animated Series
| 
|-
| The Cleveland Show
| Choice Animated Series
| 
|-
!scope="row" rowspan="4" | 2012
| Family Guy
| Choice Animated Series
| 
| style="text-align:center;" rowspan="4"|
|-
| rowspan="3" |Ted
| Choice Summer Movie: Comedy or Music
| 
|-
| Choice Movie Voice
| 
|-
| Choice Movie Chemistry 
| 
|-
!scope="row" | 2013
| Family Guy
| Choice Animated Series
| 
| style="text-align:center;"|
|-
!scope="row" rowspan="2" | 2014
| Family Guy
| Choice Animated Series
| 
| style="text-align:center;" rowspan="2"|
|-
| Cosmos: A Spacetime Odyssey
| Choice Reality Series
| 
|-
!scope="row"| 2015
| Family Guy
| Choice Animated Series
| 
| style="text-align:center;"|
|-
!scope="row"| 2016
| Family Guy
| Choice Animated Series
| 
| style="text-align:center;"|
|-
!scope="row"| 2017
| Family Guy
| Choice Animated Series
| 
| style="text-align:center;"|
|-
!scope="row"| 2018
| Family Guy
| Choice Animated Series
| 
| style="text-align:center;"|
|}

Webby Awards
The Webby Awards is an award for excellence on the Internet presented annually by The International Academy of Digital Arts and Sciences. Categories include websites, interactive advertising, online film and video, and mobile. MacFarlane has received one award.

!
|-
!scope="row"|2009
|Seth MacFarlane
|Film & Video Person of the Year
|
|style="text-align:center;"|
|}

Young Artist Awards 
Presented by Young Artist Association, a non-profit organization, the Young Artist Awards are held annually to honor young performers. MacFarlane has been nominated once.

!
|-
!scope="row" |2008
| The Winner
| Best Family Television Series
| 
| style="text-align:center;" |
|}

See also
Seth MacFarlane filmography

References

External links

MacFarlane, Seth
MacFarlane, Seth